The Batei Warsaw (Warsaw Houses) quarter in Mea She'arim neighborhood of Jerusalem was built in the Ottoman period as a by Kollel Polen (Poland) Warsaw, for Polish Torah scholars. Their families receive apartments for key money or low rent. The neighbourhood consists of two rows of two-story houses parallel with the “Mea Shearim” Street and “Chayei Adam” Street.

Kollel Polin Warsaw established the neighbourhood for poor scholars. Raising money to build the area began in 1885. the land was purchased in 1891 by Joshua Helfman. Although the lot was purchased already in 1891, fundraising difficulties delayed the construction of the neighbourhood. In 1894, philanthropist Rabbi Shraga Jacob ben R' Isaac of Lublin Tennenwurzel donated the rest of the money and the houses were named "נחלת יעקב" ("inheritance of Jacob").

In a newspaper report (חבצלת May 13, 1898) stated: the now consist 65 houses for rentals, for five years per family, after which it leave the apartment to other members of the Kollel. In 1924, the philanthropist David Weingarten donated money to add a second story.

References

Ashkenazi Jewish culture in Jerusalem
Mea Shearim
Polish-Jewish culture in Israel
Neighbourhoods of Jerusalem